Logo Records was a British record company formed in the mid-1970s by British record executives Geoff Hannington and Olav Wyper.  It was originally funded and part-owned by UK publishing company Marshall Cavendish.  In 1977, the company purchased Transatlantic Records which was at that time owned 75% by the Granada Group and 25% by its founder/chairman Nathan Joseph. Transatlantic was folded into Logo Records.  The company signed new artists including The Tourists and Paul Young and reissued Transatlantic back catalogue. In the 1980s the company became solely owned by Geoff Hannington. In the 1990s, Logo (and the Transatlantic Records catalogue) was sold to Castle Communications which was later absorbed by the Sanctuary Records Group.

A label called Logo Records existed in the United States in the early 1960s. It released a number of singles, including one by Bill Haley & His Comets.

References

British record labels
Record labels established in 1977
Record labels disestablished in 1980
Pop record labels